Sergio Moises Cabrera Diaz (born February 17, 1985) is a male swimmer from Paraguay. He was the nation's only swimming competitor at the 2004 Summer Olympics in Athens, Greece, where he ended up in 35th place in the men's 200 metres butterfly event.

International competitions
2003 Pan American Games
2004 Summer Olympics

References
sports-reference

Living people
1987 births
Male butterfly swimmers
Paraguayan male swimmers
Swimmers at the 1999 Pan American Games
Swimmers at the 2003 Pan American Games
Swimmers at the 2004 Summer Olympics
Olympic swimmers of Paraguay
Pan American Games competitors for Paraguay